Marion Nijhof (born September 20, 1981) is a visually impaired Dutch Paralympic swimmer competing in S11-classification swimming events. In total she won one silver medal and three bronze medals at the Summer Paralympics.

At the 2000 Summer Paralympics in Sydney, Australia, she won the bronze medal in the women's 400 metre freestyle S11 event.

Four years later, at the 2004 Summer Paralympics in Athens, Greece, she won three medals. In the women's 200 metre individual medley SM11 event she won the silver medal and she also won the bronze medals in the women's 50 metre freestyle S11 and women's 100 metre freestyle S11 events.

In 2007, she won the Disabled Sportswoman of the Year award, an annual award organised by the Dutch Olympic Committee. She was also knighted in the Order of Orange Nassau in the same year.

References

External links 
 

Living people
1981 births
Sportspeople from Utrecht (city)
Dutch female freestyle swimmers
Dutch female medley swimmers
Paralympic swimmers with a vision impairment
Swimmers at the 2000 Summer Paralympics
Swimmers at the 2004 Summer Paralympics
Medalists at the 2000 Summer Paralympics
Medalists at the 2004 Summer Paralympics
Paralympic medalists in swimming
S11-classified Paralympic swimmers
Paralympic swimmers of the Netherlands
Paralympic silver medalists for the Netherlands
Paralympic bronze medalists for the Netherlands
Medalists at the World Para Swimming Championships
20th-century Dutch women
21st-century Dutch women
Dutch blind people